
Gmina Czajków is a rural gmina (administrative district) in Ostrzeszów County, Greater Poland Voivodeship, in west-central Poland.

Villages
Gmina Czajków contains the villages and settlements of Czajków, Klon, Michałów, Mielcuchy, Mielcuchy Pierwsze, Muchy, Salamony and Zadki.

Neighbouring gminas
Gmina Czajków is bordered by the gminas of Brąszewice, Brzeziny, Galewice, Grabów nad Prosną, Klonowa and Kraszewice.

References
Polish official population figures 2006

Czajkow
Ostrzeszów County